5 Battalion 14 Środkowobośniackiej Brygady NOVJ was a Polish anti-Nazi resistance unit active in the area of Bosnia during World War II as a part of the Yugoslavian National Liberation Army.

The group was formed on 7 May 1944 by Poles of Bosnia and Herzegovina. In September 1944 it was renamed to the 3rd Battalion. The formation was terminated in August 1945.

The battalion flag was white and red (Polish Flag) with a red star (Flag of Yugoslavia).

Bibliography
 Wojsko Polskie 1939-1945 Stanisław Komornicki, Zygmunt Bielecki, Wanda Bigoszewska, Adam Jonca; Warsaw 1984

Units and formations of Polish resistance during World War II
Battalions of the Yugoslav Partisans
Military units and formations established in 1944
Military units and formations disestablished in 1945